Nāwahī is a crater on Mercury. Nawahi crater is located within the large Caloris basin. The unusual dark material creating a halo around Nāwahī makes this crater of special interest, as the dark material likely represents rocks with a different chemical and mineralogical composition than those of the neighboring surface. The crater is named after Hawaiian patriot and painter Joseph Nāwahī.

Hollows are present in Nāwahī, mostly along the terraces of the crater rim.

References

Impact craters on Mercury